Chuzzle is a tile-matching puzzle video game developed by American studio Raptisoft Games and published by PopCap Games. The game involves connecting three or more fuzzballs named Chuzzles.

Gameplay
In Chuzzle, the player is presented with a 6×6 board of multi-colored fuzzballs called "Chuzzles" coming in eight colors. Moves are made by dragging rows and columns. The rows and columns "wrap" when dragged off the grid; Chuzzles on the left reappear on the right and from top to bottom and vice versa. 

The main goal of this game involves connecting three or more Chuzzles of the same color. When three or more Chuzzles are connected, the connected Chuzzles pop and fly off the board, in which new Chuzzles fall from the top of the board, potentially creating cascades. Popping several Chuzzles in a single move awards more points. Fat Chuzzles are larger variants of Chuzzles that appear when there is a free space of 2×2 squares after Chuzzles have been popped, taking up a space of 2×2 squares on the game board. Matching with a Fat Chuzzle provides more points to the player. 

Connecting five Chuzzles of the same color will create a "Super Chuzzle" that explodes and pops Chuzzles in a 3×3 radius. Six or more Chuzzles will charge up the popped Chuzzles' eyes and fill up a great amount of the flask.

Eliminated Chuzzles' eyes fly into a flask to the left of the board. When the flask fills to its neck, the level ends, and bonus points are awarded (1,000 times the level number in Casual difficulty (up to 10,000) and 2,000 times the level number in Expert difficulty (up to 20,000)). The game features a Hint button that helps the player find a possible match but will lose points and progress in the flask when it is used.

The game features five game modes:
 Classic Chuzzle: Plays with the basic game rules. Locks will occasionally appear and connect to a Chuzzle, which prevents the player from moving the row and column the lock is on. The lock can be destroyed by connecting the locked Chuzzle with two other Chuzzles. In later levels, locks will appear more frequently. If no moves are possible, the player must use one of their two scrambles, which presents the player with a new game board without locks and Fat Chuzzles. The game ends if the player runs out of moves with no scrambles remaining.
 Speed Chuzzle: The game plays similarly to Classic Chuzzle, with the only difference being the presence of a lock timer. The lock timer fills while the player does not pop Chuzzles. Popping Chuzzles depletes the lock timer. If the lock timer fills, a lock will appear on the game board. In later levels, the lock timer will increase faster.
 Zen Chuzzle: Zen Chuzzle is an endless game mode where no locks appear. Instead of leveling up, filling the flask generates a Chuzzle that serves as a trinket. Five of them will create one strip of the rainbow. Completing the rainbow will reward a charm at the top of the game board each time.
 Mind Bender: Unlike the other game modes, Mind Bender involves attempting to line up Chuzzles to match the game board with the preset pattern shown on the left side of the screen. Mind Bender features 20 levels, each with five puzzles. Finishing at least three puzzles will allow the player to advance to the next level.
 BeChuzzed: A secret game mode unlocked by obtaining the trophies, Triple Combo!, Brainiac, Puzzler, Ten Grand!, and Seven at Once! and viewing each one in a specific order. The game mode is a nod to PopCap's Bejeweled and features gems from Diamond Mine, the first version of Bejeweled. The game mode is endless. Unlike the other game modes, progress will not save.

Various trophies are awarded to the player for certain accomplishments in the game. Examples include "Chuzzbomber," awarded for exploding 1,000 Fat Chuzzles, and "Speed Master," awarded for clearing levels in Speed Chuzzle without getting a lock.

Reception

In a brief review, PC Magazine called Chuzzle "addictive," giving the game a score of 4 out of 5. IGN reviewed the Java ME version of the game, concluding their review with a score of 7.9 out of 10. IGN felt that the title was very similar to existing "match three" offerings, although the "Mind Bender" mode provides some measure of uniqueness.

Pocket Gamer described Chuzzle Mobile as "the best mobile puzzler we've ever played," praising the game's "addictive" gameplay, as well as the game's overall look and feel.

Sequels and Spin-offs
On December 18, 2018, Raptisoft independently published a sequel, Chuzzle 2, as a free-to-play app with removable ads on iOS and Android. Chuzzle 2 features an arcade-style progression system with several different goals. Additional features to the game include a virtual pet mode known as the Chuzzarium, a daily challenge mode, and the Classic, Zen, and Speed modes from the original Chuzzle as unlockables.

On August 19, 2020, Raptisoft published a spin-off game, Chuzzle Snap! on iOS and Android. Unlike Chuzzle and Chuzzle 2, Chuzzle Snap! involves using pre-determined pieces to place on the board instead of moving lines of Chuzzles, to remove three or more connected Chuzzles of the same color.

References

External links
 Official Chuzzle website
 PopCap Games - Chuzzle (archived)

2005 video games
Flash games
IOS games
Palm OS games
Windows Mobile Professional games
Windows Mobile Standard games
PopCap games
Video games developed in the United States
Windows games
Android (operating system) games
Tile-matching video games
Single-player video games
J2ME games